The 1996 European Canoe Slalom Championships took place in Augsburg, Germany between August 29 and September 1, 1996, under the auspices of the European Canoe Association (ECA). It was the inaugural edition. The races were held on the Eiskanal which also hosted the 1972 Summer Olympics when canoe slalom made its first appearance at the Olympics.

Medal summary

Men's results

Canoe

Kayak

Women's results

Kayak

Medal table

References
 Official results
 European Canoe Association

European Canoe Slalom Championships
1996 in canoeing
European Canoe Slalom Championships
Sport in Augsburg
Canoeing and kayaking competitions in Germany
20th century in Augsburg